Kung Pao chicken, also transcribed Gong Bao or Kung Po, is a spicy, stir-fried Chinese dish made with cubes of chicken, peanuts, vegetables (traditionally Welsh onion only ), and chili peppers. The classic dish in Sichuan cuisine originated in the Sichuan province of south-western China and includes Sichuan peppercorns. Although the dish is found throughout China, there are regional variations that are typically less spicy than the Sichuan serving. Western Kung Pao chicken is also a staple of Westernized Chinese cuisine.

History

The dish is believed to be named after Ding Baozhen (1820–1886), a late Qing Dynasty official and governor of Sichuan Province. His title was Taizi Shaobao, which is one of Gongbao. The name Kung Pao chicken is derived from this title, while the use of the character  dīng in the name of the dish is a pun on his surname Dīng, a Moderately common Chinese surname that can also be read to mean "small cube" (like the cubes the chicken is diced into for the dish).

During the Cultural Revolution, the dish's name became politically incorrect because of its association with the imperial system. The dish was renamed "spicy chicken" by Maoists until its political rehabilitation in the 1980s under Deng Xiaoping's reforms.

Versions

Sichuan version
The original Sichuan version uses chicken as its primary ingredient. In this original version, diced chicken is typically mixed with a prepared marinade. Shaoxing wine is used to enhance flavor in the marinade. The wok is seasoned and then chili peppers and Sichuan peppercorns are flash-fried to add fragrance to the oil. In Sichuan, or when preparing Sichuan-style Kung Pao chicken, usually Sichuan-style chili peppers such as facing heaven pepper or seven stars pepper are used. Smaller, thinner Sichuanese varieties may also be used. Sichuan peppercorns are then added; while Kung Pao chicken does not belong to the numbing-spicy "mala" flavor profile, a small amount of fresh toasted peppercorns are traditionally used to balance the heat of the chilis. Then the chicken is stir-fried and chopped welsh onion, along with peanuts, are added. Kung Pao chicken starts off with fresh, moist, unroasted peanuts. These are often used instead of their pre-roasted versions. The peanuts are dropped into the hot oil at the bottom of the wok, then deep-fried until golden brown before the other ingredients are added.

Variants exist that use other meats in place of chicken, such as "Kung Pao shrimp"  and "Kung Pao frog legs".

Guizhou version
The neighboring province of Guizhou, southeast of Sichuan, has a variant of Kung Pao chicken based on the ciba fermented chili paste ( cíbā làjiāo) of Guizhou cuisine. Like the Sichuan version, the dish features marinated cubes of chicken; while the Guizhou marinade is largely the same as the Sichuan version's, the chicken cubes are larger and typically skin-on. The dish is further distinguished in that rather than flash-frying whole peppers in oil before stir-frying, a large quantity of the ciba chili paste is fried in the wok until the oil is stained. The chicken is then stir-fried in the resulting sauce with garlic, ginger, and green garlic or green onion.

Western versions
Versions commonly found in the West, called Kung Pao chicken, Kung Po, or just chicken chili and garlic, consist of diced, marinated chicken, stir-fried with orange or orange juice, ginger, garlic, chicken broth, sugar, cooking oil, corn starch, and salt and pepper to taste. Many other vegetables may be added, such as onion, bell pepper or carrots. The dish often includes or is garnished with whole roasted peanuts. Instead of chicken, Western variations sometimes substitute other meat such as pork, duck, fish, shrimp, or tofu.

See also

 List of chicken dishes
 List of Chinese dishes

References

Chinese chicken dishes
Chili pepper dishes
Peanut dishes
Sichuan cuisine
Spicy foods